The Ambassador of Germany to China is an officer of the German Foreign Office and the head of the Embassy of the Federal Republic of Germany to the People's Republic of China. The position has the rank and status of an Ambassador Extraordinary and Plenipotentiary and is currently held by Patricia Flor. The Federal Republic of Germany and the PRC have enjoyed diplomatic relations since 1972, while the German Democratic Republic had relations with the PRC from 25 October 1949. Unofficial representation to Taiwan has been undertaken by the German Institute Taipei since 2000.

Office holders

German Ministers to China, 1873–1931

Ambassadors of Germany to China, 1931–1945

Ambassadors of the Federal Republic of Germany

Ambassadors of the German Democratic Republic, 1949–1990

See also
Germany-China relations
Foreign relations of Germany

References
Tobias C. Bringmann: Handbuch der Diplomatie, 1815-1963: Auswärtige Missionschefs in Deutschland und Deutsche Missionschefs im Ausland von Metternich bis Adenauer, de Gruyter, 2001, p. 91.

External links
German Embassy Beijing

 
Ambassadors of East Germany
Germany
China
Germany